Taco Trip is a Cooking Channel show about Latin cuisine in America, hosted by chef Aaron Sanchez. The show debuted December 16, 2014 and ended on January 20, 2015, featuring chef Sanchez visiting taquerias in six American cities. Sanchez visited a different city in each episode to explore their cuisine, starting with Chicago, followed by New Orleans, Portland, San Francisco, Philadelphia, and Nashville.

Episodes

References

External links 
 Taco Trip on Cooking Channel
 IMDB

Cooking Channel original programming
2014 American television series debuts